The Wasatch and Uinta montane forest is a temperate coniferous forest ecoregion in the Wasatch Range and Uinta Mountains of the western Rocky Mountains system, in the Western United States.

Setting
This ecoregion is located almost entirely within the state of Utah, with a very small portion stretching north into southwestern Wyoming and southeastern Idaho. This ecoregion covers the driest ranges of the Rocky Mountains, in the rain shadow of the Sierra Nevada to the west.

Flora
The dominant vegetation type of this ecoregion is coniferous forest, composed mainly of ponderosa pine (Pinus ponderosa), Rocky Mountain Douglas-fir (Pseudotsuga menziesii subsp. glauca), subalpine fir (Abies lasiocarpa), Engelmann spruce (Picea engelmanni) and trembling aspen (Populus tremuloides), with limited populations of limber pine (Pinus flexilis). This ecoregion is unique from other Rocky Mountain ecoregions in that large areas are dominated by Gambel oak (Quercus gambelii).

Fauna
Mammals include mule deer (Odocoileus hemonius), elk (Cervus canadensis), moose (Alces alces), bighorn sheep (Ovis canadensis), mountain goat (Oreamnos americanus), black bear (Ursus americanus) cougar (Puma concolor), and wolverine (Gulo gulo)

Brown bear and gray wolf, are also native to these forests, and much of the rest of Utah, but have been extirpated due to hunting, with brown bears having not been found in utah since roughly 1922, when the last grizzly bear Old Ephraim was shot and killed. Gray wolves have begun to return to utah, primarily in the far northeastern reaches of state, where it borders Wyoming and Idaho. Both Bears and Wolves have been under threat, due primarily to the livestock industry which is an obstacle currently preventing their return.

Threats and preservation
The majority of this ecoregion has been greatly affected by livestock grazing, logging, mining, and recreational uses such as downhill skiing, and as a result, its conservation status is "critical/endangered". Very few areas are protected, and the largest area that is protected, the High Uintas Wilderness in northeastern Utah, mainly protects areas in the high alpine zone, with the more diverse montane and subalpine zones being almost entirely unprotected. The main threats to this ecoregion's integrity are motorised recreation, widespread livestock grazing and downhill skiing. This region has also been severely effected by mountain pine beetle outbreaks in the last decades, killing large swathes of forest.

See also
List of ecoregions in the United States (WWF)

References

Wasatch and Uinta montane forests (National Geographic)
Wasatch and Uinta montane forests (Vanderbilt University)

Forests of the Rocky Mountains
Temperate coniferous forests of the United States
Forests of Utah
Forests of Idaho
Forests of Wyoming
Forests
Wasatch Range
Uinta National Forest
Wasatch-Cache National Forest
Wasatch
 Wasatch and Uinta montane forests
Ecoregions of the United States
Plant communities of the Western United States
Nearctic ecoregions